McClintock Island (Ostrov Mak-Klintoka) is an island in Franz Josef Land, Russia.

The island's northernmost point is called Cape Greely (мыс Грили). The northerwestern point is Cape Karpinsky (мыс Карпинского), the southwestern point is Cape Dillon (мыс Диллона). From north to south, Cape Bergen (мыс Берген), Cape Brünn (мыс Брюнн), and Cape Oppolzer (мыс Оппольцера) are located on the eastern shore.

Adjacent islands
McClintock Island  is located very close to the west of Hall Island, separated from it by a narrow sound, Proliv Negri.
Alger Island (Остров Алджер), lies off McClintock Island's northern shore, separated from it by a  narrow sound. Alger Island was the wintering site of the failed American Baldwin-Ziegler Polar Expedition of 1901-1902.
Brady Island (Остров Брейди), is a relatively large, mostly glaciated island. This island was named after English chemist, pharmacist and geologist George Brady. Cape Wiese, Brady Island's northernmost cape, is named after Russian Arctic expert Vladimir Wiese.
Right by McClintock Island's southern shore, there is a group of islets called Ostrova Borisika.
Another small group of islands, Ostrova Lyuriki, lie slightly further to the west.
 off the southern coast lies Aagaard Island (Остров Огорд). This island was named by Walter Wellman in honor of Andreas Zacharias Aagaard (1847–1925), a Norwegian merchant who acted as agent in Tromsø for Wellman's expeditions. Aaagaard had also been consul for Austria-Hungary at the time of the Austro-Hungarian North Pole Expedition.

History 
The island was discovered by the Austro-Hungarian North Pole expedition in March 1874. They named it after Irish explorer of the Arctic Francis Leopold McClintock. During his third sledge trip, co-expedition leader Julius Payer climbed Cape Brünn from which he attempted to survey the southern coast of Zichy Land and estimated the westward extent of Franz Josef Land to reach 50° E at least.

The Baldwin-Ziegler Polar Expedition were the next to set foot on the island on 1 September 1901, at Cape Dillon. This was also the spot where the first members of the stranded Ziegler Polar Expedition were found by Johan Kjeldsen aboard the Terra Nova on 30 July 1905.

See also 
 List of islands of Russia

References 

Islands of Franz Josef Land
Uninhabited islands of Russia